Sam Iles (born 19 June 1987) is an Australian rules footballer who played for Collingwood and Gold Coast in the Australian Football League (AFL).

Football career

Iles was picked up in the 2006 Pre-Season draft by Collingwood after he was not taken in the National Draft weeks earlier. Iles played in the VFL for Tasmania as well as for state side in the TAC Cup, which showed signs of development at an early age. He made his debut against Adelaide at AAMI Stadium late in the 2006 season. He played 4 games, being dropped before the finals.

Iles found it hard to break into the Collingwood line-up, even with strong and consistent form for Williamstown, managing just the one senior game in the first half of the season, whilst being named as an emergency on nine occasions. He returned to the side again in Round 14 against St Kilda and performed well, gathering 19 possessions and making four tackles to help the Magpies win after being 21-points down in the last quarter. However, he would only play for Collingwood the following week against Geelong before being dropped back to Williamstown for the remainder of the year.

Sam got delisted at the end of the 2008 season, after failing to play a senior game for Collingwood in 2008. In 2009, he played for Box Hill Hawks in the VFL, and was drafted to the new Gold Coast Football Club in the 2010 Rookie Draft.
Iles made his Gold Coast debut in their first win against  at AAMI Stadium in round 5.

Iles was delisted by the Suns at the end of 2012 and joined Box Hill Hawks in the VFL in time for the start of the 2013 season. Iles was a member of Box Hill's premiership-winning team in 2013 and also played in Box Hill's 2014 grand final team that lost to the Footscray Bulldogs.

References

External links 

1987 births
Living people
Collingwood Football Club players
Gold Coast Football Club players
Tassie Mariners players
Box Hill Football Club players
Tasmanian Devils Football Club players
Clarence Football Club players
Australian rules footballers from Tasmania